The AFL Women's leading goalkicker award is awarded annually to the AFL Women's (AFLW) player who kicks the most goals during the home-and-away season.

Winners

See also 

Coleman Medal

References

External links
 AFLW Awards
 AFLW All Time Leading Goalkickers

Goalkicker
Awards established in 2017
!goalkicker
2017 establishments in Australia